The Rainbow Visions Film Festival is an annual film festival in Edmonton, Alberta, which presents an annual program of LGBT film.

Launched in 2015 by Metro Cinema Edmonton, the organizers of the city's Northwestfest (formerly known as "Global Visions") documentary film festival, the event is staged in the fall each year at the city's Garneau Theatre.

Its creation followed the demise of the city's former LGBT film festival, Queer Sightings.

See also
 List of LGBT film festivals
 List of film festivals in Canada

References

External links

LGBT film festivals in Canada
Film festivals in Edmonton
Film festivals established in 2015
2015 establishments in Alberta
LGBT in Alberta